"Baby You're Right" is a song by Joe Tex. He recorded it for Anna Records in 1961. Tex re-recorded "Baby You're Right" for Checker Records in 1965.

James Brown recording
Later in 1961, James Brown recorded the song, altering the melody and lyrics and adding a songwriting credit for himself. Released as a single on King Records, his version was a hit, charting #2 R&B and #49 Pop in 1962. It also appeared on the album Think! in 1960, and later on Papa's Got a Brand New Bag in 1965. An alternate take of the song was included in the 1991 box set Star Time.

References

Joe Tex songs
James Brown songs
Songs written by Joe Tex
Songs written by James Brown
1961 singles
1961 songs
King Records (United States) singles